Karimuddinpur is a village located in Mohammadabad tehsil of Ghazipur district, Uttar Pradesh, India with a total of 1,738 families residing. The Karimuddinpur village has a population of 10,161 as per Population Census 2011.

History
As per historical records Karimuddinpur was established by Prithviraj Shah, the great great  grandson of Raja Mulhan Dikshit in 1362 A.D. It was the period of Sultan Feroze Shah Tughluq's rule at Delhi when Prithviraj Shah moved towards North-East of Saharmadih near Mangai River and established this village. The third branch of Kinwars flourished here. Prithviraj Shah had seventeen great grandsons through his son Nainan Shah. These all seventeen grandsons established 17 villages in Karail area, known as "Sataraho".

 This village gave many freedom fighters like Beni Madhav Rai and others who fought for freedom.

Administration
Karimuddinpur village is administrated by head of Village(ग्राम प्रधान) who is elected representative of village as per constitution of India and Panchayati Raj Act. At present Fareeda Parveen  is head of the village(ग्राम प्रधान).

Transport
Karimuddinpur could be reached through road and rail route. Karimuddinpur has its own railway station on Varanasi-Chhapra route.

Nearby places
Ballia
Ghazipur
Varanasi
Buxar
Mohammadabad
Rasra
Chitbara Gaon
Joga Musahib
Rajapur, Ghazipur

References

External links
Villages in Ghazipur  Uttar Pradesh

Villages in Ghazipur district